Dorogoshch is a rural locality (a selo) and the administrative center of Dorogoshchanskoye Rural Settlement, Grayvoronsky District, Belgorod Oblast, Russia. The population was 698 as of 2010. There are 16 streets.

Geography 
Dorogoshch is located 15 km northwest of Grayvoron (the district's administrative centre) by road. Sankovo is the nearest rural locality.

References 

Rural localities in Grayvoronsky District
Grayvoronsky Uyezd